Leverett is an unincorporated community in Champaign County, Illinois, United States. Leverett is located along a railroad line north of Urbana.

References

Unincorporated communities in Champaign County, Illinois
Unincorporated communities in Illinois